Rye Beach is an unincorporated community along the Atlantic Ocean in Rye, New Hampshire, United States. It is located along New Hampshire Route 1A near the southern border of the town of Rye, directly south of Jenness State Beach and north of Little Boar's Head (in the neighboring town of North Hampton). Rye Beach has a separate ZIP code (03871) from the rest of the town of Rye.

The Ocean House, built in 1844, was owned by Job Jenness. The hostelry was financed by Stacy Nudd. It started out small and eventually reached four stories, with accommodations for 250 guests.

Originally known as the Philbrick Hotel by John Colby Philbrick in 1865. A visit by Admiral David Farragut caused the building to be coined "Farragut House".

Transatlantic Communications Cable Station

In 1874, the Direct United States Cable Company's CS Faraday laid a transatlantic communications cable from Ballinskelligs, Ireland, routed to Tor Bay, Nova Scotia, then to Rye Beach, encompassing . The Direct United States Cable Company communications station was located on Old Beach Road near the Rye Beach life saving station and beyond the Sunken Forests of New Hampshire.

In 1970, the state of New Hampshire recognized the Direct United States Cable Company receiving station by erecting a New Hampshire historical marker (number 63) on New Hampshire Route 1A near Jenness State Beach.

See also
 History of New Hampshire
 Seacoast Region (New Hampshire)
 Odiorne Point State Park

References 

Unincorporated communities in New Hampshire
Unincorporated communities in Rockingham County, New Hampshire
Populated coastal places in New Hampshire